Progressive supranuclear palsy (PSP) is a late-onset degenerative disease involving the gradual deterioration and death of specific volumes of the brain. The condition leads to symptoms including loss of balance, slowing of movement, difficulty moving the eyes, and cognitive impairment.  PSP may be mistaken for other neurodegenerative diseases such as Parkinson's, frontotemporal dementia and Alzheimer's. The cause of the condition is uncertain, but involves accumulation of tau protein within the brain.  Medications such as levodopa and amantadine may be useful in some cases.

PSP affects about six people per 100,000. The first symptoms typically occur at 60–70 years of age. Males are slightly more likely to be affected than females.  No association has been found between PSP and any particular race, location, or occupation.

Signs and symptoms
The initial symptoms in two-thirds of cases are loss of balance, lunging forward when mobilizing, fast walking, bumping into objects or people, and falls. Dementia symptoms are also initially seen in about one in five cases of frontotemporal dementia.

Other common early symptoms are changes in personality, general slowing of movement, and visual symptoms. The most common behavioural  symptoms in patients with PSP include apathy, a lack of inhibition, anxiety, and a profound state of unease or dissatisfaction.

Later symptoms and signs can include, but do not necessarily include dementia (typically including loss of inhibition and ability to organize information), slurring of speech, difficulty swallowing, and difficulty moving the eyes, particularly in the vertical direction.  The latter accounts for some of the falls experienced by these patients, as they find it difficult to look up or down.

Some of the other signs are poor eyelid function, contracture of the facial muscles, a backward tilt of the head with stiffening of the neck muscles, sleep disruption, urinary incontinence, and constipation.  Some patients retain full cognitive function up to the end.

The visual symptoms are of particular importance in the diagnosis of this disorder.  Patients typically complain of difficulty reading due to the inability to look down well. The ophthalmoparesis experienced by these patients mainly concerns voluntary eye movement and the inability to make vertical saccades, which is often worse with downward saccades.  Patients tend to have difficulty looking down (a downgaze palsy) followed by the addition of an upgaze palsy. This vertical gaze paresis will correct when the examiner passively rolls the patient's head up and down as part of a test for the oculocephalic reflex.  Involuntary eye movement, as elicited by Bell's phenomenon, for instance, may be closer to normal. On close inspection, eye movements called "square-wave jerks" may be visible when the patient fixes at distance. These are fine movements, that can be mistaken for nystagmus, except that they are saccadic in nature, with no smooth phase. Although healthy individuals also make square-wave jerk movements, PSP patients make slower square-wave jerk movements, with smaller vertical components. Assessment of these square-wave jerks and diminished vertical saccades is especially useful for diagnosing progressive supranuclear palsy, because these movements set PSP patients apart from other parkinsonian patients. Difficulties with convergence (convergence insufficiency), where the eyes come closer together while focusing on something near, like the pages of a book, is typical.  Because the eyes have trouble coming together to focus at short distances, the patient may complain of diplopia (double vision) when reading.

A characteristic facial appearance known as “procerus sign”, with a wide-eye stare, furrowing of forehead with a frowning expression and deepening of other facial creases is diagnostic of PSP.

Cause
The cause of PSP is unknown. Fewer than 1% of those with PSP have a family member with the same disorder.  A variant in the gene for tau protein called the H1 haplotype, located on chromosome 17 (rs1800547), has been linked to PSP. Nearly all people with PSP received a copy of that variant from each parent, but this is true of about two-thirds of the general population.  Therefore, the H1 haplotype appears to be necessary but not sufficient to cause PSP.  Other genes, as well as environmental toxins, are being investigated as other possible contributors to the cause of PSP.

Additionally, the H2 haplotype, combined with vascular dysfunction, seems to be a factor of vascular progressive supranuclear palsy.

Besides tauopathy, mitochondrial dysfunction seems to be a factor involved in PSP. Especially, mitochondrial complex I inhibitors (such as acetogenins and quinolines contained in Annonaceae, as well as rotenoids) are implicated in PSP-like brain injuries.

Pathophysiology
The affected brain cells are both neurons and glial cells. The neurons display neurofibrillary tangles (NFTs), which are clumps of tau protein, a normal part of a brain cell's internal structural skeleton. These tangles are often different from those seen in Alzheimer's disease, but may be structurally similar when they occur in the cerebral cortex. Their chemical composition is usually different, however, and is similar to that of tangles seen in corticobasal degeneration. Tufts of tau protein in astrocytes, or tufted astrocytes, are also considered diagnostic. Unlike globose NFTs, they may be more widespread in the cortex. Lewy bodies are seen in some cases, but whether this is a variant or an independent co-existing process is not clear, and in some cases, PSP can coexist with corticobasal degeneration, Parkinson's, and/or Alzheimer's disease, particularly with older patients.

The principal areas of the brain affected are the:
 basal ganglia, particularly the subthalamic nucleus, substantia nigra, and globus pallidus
 brainstem, particularly the tectum (the portion of the midbrain where "supranuclear" eye movement resides), as well as dopaminergic nuclei.
 cerebral cortex, particularly that of the frontal lobes and the limbic system (similarly to frontotemporal degeneration)
 dentate nucleus of the cerebellum
 spinal cord, particularly the area where some control of the bladder and bowel resides

Some consider PSP, corticobasal degeneration, and frontotemporal dementia to be variations of the same disease. Others consider them separate diseases. PSP has been shown occasionally to co-exist with Pick's disease.

Diagnosis
Magnetic resonance imaging (MRI) is often used to diagnose PSP. MRI may show atrophy in the midbrain with preservation of the pons giving a "hummingbird" sign.

Types

Based on the pathological findings in confirmed cases of PSP, it is divided into the following categories:
 classical Richardson syndrome (PSP-RS) 
 PSP-parkinsonism (PSP-P) and PSP-pure akinesia with gait freezing (PSP-PAGF)
 frontal PSP, PSP-corticobasal syndrome (PSP-CBS), PSP-behavioural variant of frontotemporal dementia (PSP-bvFTD) and PSP-progressive non-fluent aphasia (PSP-PNFA)
 PSP-C
 PSP induced by Annonaceae

Richardson syndrome is characterized by the typical features of PSP. In PSP-P features of Parkinson’s Disease overlap with the clinical presentation of PSP and follows a more benign course. In both PSP-P and PSP- PAGF distribution of abnormal tau is relatively restricted to the brain stem. Frontal PSP initially presents with behavioral and cognitive symptoms, with or without ophthalmoparesis and then evolve into typical PSP. The phenotypes of PSP-P and PSP-PAGF are sometimes referred as the ‘brain stem’ variants of PSP, as opposed to the ‘cortical’ variants which present with predominant cortical features including PSP-CBS, PSP-bvFTD, and PSP-PNFA. Cerebellar ataxia as the predominant early presenting feature is increasingly recognized as a very rare subtype of PSP (PSP-C) which is associated with severe neuronal loss with gliosis and higher densities of coiled bodies in the cerebellar dentate nucleus.

Differential diagnosis
PSP is frequently misdiagnosed as Parkinson's disease because they both involve slowed movements and gait difficulty, with PSP being one of a collection of diseases referred to as Parkinson plus syndromes. Both Parkinson's and PSP have an onset in late middle age and involve slowing and rigidity of movement. However, several distinguishing features exist. Tremor is very common with Parkinson's, but rare with PSP. Speech and swallowing difficulties are more common and severe with PSP and the abnormal eye movements of PSP are essentially absent with PD. A poor response to levodopa along with symmetrical onset can also help differentiate PSP from PD. Patients with the Richardson variant of PSP tend to have an upright posture or arched back, as opposed to the stooped-forward posture of other Parkinsonian disorders, although PSP-Parkinsonism (see below) can demonstrate a stooped posture. Early falls are also more common with PSP, especially with Richardson syndrome.

PSP can also be misdiagnosed as Alzheimer's disease because of the behavioral changes.

Chronic traumatic encephalopathy shows many similarities with PSP.

Management

Treatment

No cure for PSP is known, and management is primarily supportive. PSP cases are often split into two subgroups, PSP-Richardson, the classic type, and PSP-Parkinsonism, where a short-term response to levodopa can be obtained. Dyskinesia is an occasional but rare complication of treatment. Amantadine is also sometimes helpful. After a few years the Parkinsonian variant tends to take on Richardson features. Other variants have been described.  Botox can be used to treat neck dystonia and blepharospasm, but this can aggravate dysphagia.

Two studies have suggested that rivastigmine may help with cognitive aspects, but the authors of both studies have suggested a larger sampling be used. There is some evidence that the hypnotic zolpidem may improve motor function and eye movements, but only from small-scale studies.

Rehabilitation
Patients with PSP usually seek or are referred to occupational therapy, speech-language pathology for motor speech changes typically a spastic-ataxic dysarthria,  and physical therapy for balance and gait problems with reports of frequent falls. Evidence-based approaches to rehabilitation in PSP are lacking and, currently, the majority of research on the subject consists of case reports involving only a small number of patients.

Case reports of rehabilitation programs for patients with PSP generally include limb-coordination activities, tilt-board balancing, gait training, strength training with progressive resistive exercises, and isokinetic exercises and stretching of the neck muscles. While some case reports suggest that physiotherapy can offer improvements in balance and gait of patients with PSP, the results cannot be generalized across all PSP patients, as each case report followed only one or two patients. The observations made from these case studies can be useful, however, in helping to guide future research concerning the effectiveness of balance and gait training programs in the management of PSP.

Individuals with PSP are often referred to occupational therapists to help manage their condition and to help enhance their independence. This may include being taught to use mobility aids.  Due to their tendency to fall backwards, the use of a walker, particularly one that can be weighted in the front, is recommended over a cane.  The use of an appropriate mobility aid helps to decrease the individual’s risk of falls and makes them safer to ambulate independently in the community.
Due to their balance problems and irregular movements, individuals need to spend time learning how to safely transfer in their homes and in the community. This may include rising from and sitting in chairs safely.

Due to the progressive nature of this disease, all individuals eventually lose their ability to walk and will need to progress to using a wheelchair. Severe dysphagia often follows, and at this point death is often a matter of months.

Prognosis
No effective treatment or cure has been found for PSP, although some of the symptoms can respond to nonspecific measures. The poor prognosis is predominantly attributed to the serious impact this condition has on the quality of life. The average age at symptoms onset is 63 and survival from onset averages seven years with a wide variance. Pneumonia is a frequent cause of death.

History 
In 1877, Charcot described a 40-year-old woman who had rigid-akinetic parkinsonism, neck dystonia, dysarthria, and eye-movement problems. Chavany and others reported the clinical and pathologic features of a 50-year-old man with a rigid and akinetic form of parkinsonism with postural instability, neck dystonia, dysarthria, and staring gaze in 1951.
Progressive supranuclear palsy was first described as a distinct disorder by neurologists John Steele, John Richardson, and Jerzy Olszewski in 1963. They recognized the same clinical syndrome in 8 patients and described the autopsy findings in 6 of them in 1963.

Progressive supranuclear palsy was not a “new” disease in 1963, as 22 well-documented case reports had been identified in the neurologic literature between 1877 and 1963. The unique frontal lobe cognitive changes of progressive supranuclear palsy (apathy, loss of spontaneity, slowing of thought processes, and loss of executive functions) were first described by Albert and colleagues in 1974.

Society and culture
There are several organizations around the world that support PSP patients and the research into PSP and related diseases, such as corticobasal degeneration (CBD) and multiple system atrophy (MSA).
 Canada: PSP Society of Canada, a federally registered non-profit organization which serves patients and families dealing with PSP, CBD and MSA, set up in 2017 through the help of CurePSP in the USA
 France: Association PSP France, a nonprofit patient association set up in 1996 through the help of PSPA in the UK. It also gives support to French speaking patients in Quebec, Morocco, Algeria, Belgium and Lebanon
 UK: PSPA, a national charity for information, patient support and research of PSP and CBD, set up in 1995
 Ireland: PSPAI, a body which aims to get PSP better known
 US: CurePSP, a nonprofit organization for promoting awareness, care and research of PSP, CBD, MSA "and other prime of life neurodegenerative diseases"

In popular culture
In the 2020 American musical comedy-drama television series, Zoey's Extraordinary Playlist, the title character's father (Mitch Clarke, played by Peter Gallagher) has PSP and dies in the final episode of the first season.

American singer Linda Ronstadt was diagnosed with PSP in 2019, subsequent to an initial diagnosis of Parkinson's disease in 2014.

See also
 Lytico-bodig disease (Parkinsonism-Dementia Complex of Guam)
 Annonacin

References 

Cognitive disorders
Corticobasal syndrome
Extrapyramidal and movement disorders
Rare diseases
Syndromes